Austin Schlottmann (born September 18, 1995) is an American football center for the Minnesota Vikings of the National Football League (NFL). He played college football at TCU.

Early years
Schlottmann was born and raised in Brenham, Texas, where he became a football star at Brenham High School, earning All-State honors in 2013 while helping lead the Cubs to the Class 4A Championship game at AT&T Stadium. On February 5, 2014, he signed a national letter of intent to play college football at Texas Christian University in Fort Worth, Texas.

College career
Schlottmann enrolled at TCU in the summer of 2014, and played in all 13 of the Frogs' games that fall as true freshman in 2014, a season in which they won a Big 12 championship and rank third in the final polls after blowing out Ole Miss, 42-3, in the Peach Bowl.  He started 29 games for the TCU in the next three seasons and was named 2nd Team All-Big 12 as a junior in 2016.

Professional career

Denver Broncos
After going undrafted in the 2018 NFL Draft, Schlottmann signed as a free agent with the Denver Broncos as an undrafted free agent  which reunited him with high school teammate Courtland Sutton.  He spent the entire 2018 season on the Broncos' practice squad, but made the active roster coming out of training camp in his second year with the team  and made his regular season debut September 9, 2019 against the Oakland Raiders on Monday Night Football. He was named the starting right guard in Week 14 after Ronald Leary was out the rest of the season.

On August 31, 2021, Schlottmann was waived by the Broncos and re-signed to the practice squad the next day. He was promoted to the active roster on November 9, 2021.

Minnesota Vikings
On March 16, 2022, Schlottmann signed with the Minnesota Vikings. He was placed on injured reserve on January 3, 2023.

References

External links
TCU bio
Denver Broncos bio

1995 births
Living people
People from Brenham, Texas
Players of American football from Texas
American football offensive linemen
TCU Horned Frogs football players
Denver Broncos players
Minnesota Vikings players